The Last Pogo is a short film made by Colin Brunton in 1978.

Shot in Toronto, at the Horseshoe Tavern, The Last Pogo concert on December 1 was billed as "the last punk rock concert" in Toronto—at least for that original wave of punkers circa 1977/1978. Named as ironic tribute to "The Last Waltz", the concert film of the final concert by The Band directed by Martin Scorsese. Featuring performances by The Scenics, The Cardboard Brains, The Secrets, The Mods, The Ugly, The Viletones and Teenage Head, the event also spawned a live recording called And Now Live From Toronto -- The Last Pogo.

Apart from the performances, the highlight of the film was probably the shots of the aftermath, because during the show, a bit of a riot occurred. Brunton's crew was ushered outside by police and firefighters, but the sound recordist stuck it out.

The film itself was available only in bootleg copies and occasional airings until its release on DVD in 2008. The DVD was released as a tribute to Teenage Head frontman Frankie Venom.

Cast
Teenage Head as Themselves
The Viletones as Themselves
The Ugly as Themselves
The Mods as Themselves
The Secrets as Themselves
The Cardboard Brains as Themselves
The Scenics as Themselves
Margaret Barnes-DelColle as herself
Gary Courmier as himself
Mickey DeSadist (of the Forgotten Rebels) as himself
Gary Topp as himself
Members of The Curse as Themselves

Soundtrack

The soundtrack album was entitled "And Now Live From Toronto -- The Last Pogo" on Bomb Records and contained some performances that were not included in the film.

Track listing;

1. The Secrets - Teenage Rampage

2. Drastic Measures - Flowers

3. Cardboard Brains - Babies Run My World

4. The Scenics - In The Summer

5. The Scenics - Sunshine World

6. The Mods - Between Four Walls

7. The Everglades - Rock & Roll Cliche

8. The Secrets - Shout (Isley Brothers cover)

9. The Ugly - All Because Of You

10. Ishan Band - Egzebier (Peter Tosh cover)

11. Cardboard Brains - Jungles

12. Drastic Measures - Mr. America

13. The Everglades - I'm In A Coma

14. The Mods - Step Out Tonight

Second film

In 2013 Brunton released The Last Pogo Jumps Again, which was a full-length documentary (200 minutes) about the first wave of punk in Toronto, Hamilton and London, Ontario in the late 1970s and early 1980s. The film, co-directed by Brunton and Kire Paputts, contained footage from the original film along with other archival footage of the era as well as contemporary interview footage. Besides the above mentioned bands the film included footage and interviews with B-Girls, Nash the Slash, Johnny and the G-Rays, The Sidhes, Bob Segarini, Cleave Anderson (of Blue Rodeo), Martha and the Muffins, Rough Trade, The Diodes, The Demics and Simply Saucer among others.

References

Worth, Liz. Treat Me Like Dirt Bongo Beat, 2010
Sutherland, Sam. Perfect Youth, The Birth Of Canadian Punk ECW Press, 2012

External links

http://www.imdb.com/title/tt0808447 (IMDB entry for second film)
http://www.thelastpogo.net (official website)

Concert films
Documentary films about punk music and musicians
Documentary films about Toronto
1978 films
1978 documentary films
Canadian short documentary films
Canadian musical films
1970s English-language films
1970s Canadian films
Punk films
1970s short documentary films